Allie (or Alice) Vibert Douglas,  (December 15, 1894 – July 2, 1988), who usually went by her middle name, was a Canadian astronomer and astrophysicist.

Life
Douglas was born in Montreal, Quebec, on 15 December 1894. Because both of Douglas' parents died the year she was born, she first lived in London, England with her brother George Vibert Douglas, and her grandmother.  Douglas' grandfather was Rev. George Douglas, a prominent Methodist minister and educator.  In 1904 both Douglas and her brother returned to Montreal where they attended Westmount High School. Growing up, Douglas was interested in science but felt that her gender was a handicap. In high school she was refused admission to a small science club solely because she was a woman. Her brother helped her circumvent this issue by leaving the door ajar and letting Douglas sit outside the classroom to listen to lectures. Douglas graduated at the top of her class and received a scholarship to McGill University.

In 1912 she began her studies in honors mathematics and physics at McGill, but they were interrupted during her third year with the outbreak of World War I. Her brother George enlisted as an officer, was stationed near London, England and moved his family, including Douglas, with him. Douglas was then invited to join the war effort by a family friend and decided to work in the War Office as a statistician. Although bombs would fall close to her workplace, Douglas persevered and had the highest pay out of all of the temporary women civil servants in the National Service. In 1918, at the age of 23, she was awarded the Order of the British Empire for her work.

Having returned to Montreal in 1920, she continued her studies, earning a bachelor's degree and then a master's degree in 1921. She went on to the University of Cambridge, studying under Arthur Eddington, one of the leading astronomers of the day. She earned her PhD in astrophysics through McGill in 1926 and was the first person to receive it from a Quebec university, and one of the first women to accomplish this in North America. Douglas wrote an important biography  of Eddington, The Life of Arthur Eddington.

After completing her doctorate, Douglas joined the faculty at McGill, lecturing in physics and astrophysics. In 1939 she moved to Queen's University at Kingston where she served as Dean of Women until 1958. She was Professor of Astronomy from 1946 until her retirement in 1964 and was instrumental in having women accepted into engineering and medicine. During World War II she established that all students had to complete two mandatory hours of "contribution to the war effort", set up knitting stations for women between classes and required all new students to go take nursing classes. 

Douglas she was an active member of the Royal Astronomical Society of Canada (RASC) and became female president in 1943. It was largely due to her work that the Kingston Centre of the RASC was founded in 1961.

Collaborating with John Stuart Foster, she researched the spectra of A and B type stars and the Stark effect using the Dominion Astrophysical Observatory. In 1947 she became the first Canadian president of the International Astronomical Union and represented Canada during a UNESCO conference in Montevideo, Uruguay, seven years later. In 1967 she became an Officer of the Order of Canada and was named one of 10 Women of the Century by the National Council of Jewish Women. Douglas died on 2 July 1988.

Vibert Douglas has a patera (an irregular or complex crater) on Venus named after her. Vibert-Douglas Patera is located at 11.6° South latitude 194.3° East longitude. It is almost circular and 45 km in diameter. In 1988, the year of her death, asteroid 3269 was named Vibert Douglas in her honor.

See also
 List of craters on Venus

Notes

References
Allie Vibert Douglas fonds at Queen's University Archives

1894 births
1988 deaths
20th-century Canadian astronomers
Canadian astrophysicists
McGill University Faculty of Science alumni
Canadian Members of the Order of the British Empire
Officers of the Order of Canada
Scientists from Montreal
Women astronomers
20th-century Canadian women scientists
Presidents of the Royal Astronomical Society of Canada